Leandro Katz (born 1938) is an Argentine-born writer, visual artist and filmmaker known primarily for his films and photographic installations. His works include long-term, multi-media projects that delve into Latin American history through a combination of scholarly research, anthropology, photography, moving images and printed texts.

Early life and career 
He lived and worked in New York from 1965 to 2006, and currently lives in Buenos Aires. He has been a member of the faculty at the School of Visual Arts, Art History Program, Brown University, Semiotics Program, and a professor of film production and theory at the College of Arts and Communication at William Paterson University.

Larger works 

Katz's notable long-term works include The Catherwood Project, a photographic reconstruction of the two 1850s expeditions of John Lloyd Stephens and Frederick Catherwood to the Maya areas of Central America and Mexico, Project For The Day You'll Love Me, which investigates the events around the capture and execution of Che Guevara in Bolivia in 1967, Paradox which deals with Central American archaeology and the banana plantations of the United Fruit Company in Honduras and Guatemala, Vortex, which addresses the social and literary history of the rubber industry in the Amazon region of the Putumayo River based on a report by Roger Casement, and Tania, Masks and Trophies, a project that examines the figure of Tamara Bunke, the only woman who fought together with Che Guevara in his last campaign of 1967.

Other works 

Leandro Katz has produced many books and artists’ books and eighteen narrative and non-narrative films. His most recent books, Natural History, and The Ghosts of Ñancahuazú, were published in 2010.  His artist’s book dealing with matters of time and daily life, S(h)elf Portrait, was published in Buenos Aires in 2008. In 2019, he published Bedlam Days: The Early Plays of Charles Ludlam and The Ridiculous Theatrical Company with over 200 never-before-seen photographs of Ludlam's avant garde plays of the 60s and 70s, and with extended quotations from "Queer Theatre" by Stefan Brecht.

Recognition 

Leandro Katz's work has earned the Guggenheim Fellowship, the Rockefeller Foundation Fellowship, and the National Endowment for the Arts Fellowship, and he has received support from the New York State Council on the Arts, the Jerome Foundation, and the Hubert Bals Fund, Rotterdam International Film Festival. His film, The Day You'll Love Me won the Coral Prize at the Festival del Nuevo Cine Latinoamericano de La Habana, among others.
In 2021 he was awarded the Premio Nacional a la Trayectoria by the National Minister of Culture, Argentina, 109 Salón Nacional.

Exhibitions 

Leandro Katz has exhibited as an artist, and screened his films, at institutions including the Museum of Modern Art, Whitney Museum of American Art, the New Museum of Contemporary Art, El Museo del Barrio, the Brooklyn Museum, MoMA PS1, the Chicago Art Institute, the Museum of Contemporary Art, Los Angeles, the Buenos Aires Museum of Modern Art, the Bienal de La Habana, Cuba, and the Museo Nacional Centro de Arte Reina Sofía, among others.

Recent exhibitions include Encuentros de Pamplona 72: fin de fiesta del arte experimental, Museo Nacional Centro de Arte Reina Sofía, Madrid, Natural History, Henrique Faría Gallery, NY, Imán-New York, Fundacion Proa, Buenos Aires, 10,000 Lives – Gwangju Biennale, South Korea, Leandro Katz: Arrebatos, Diagonales y Rupturas (Raptures, Diagonals and Ruptures), Espacio Fundación Telefónica, Buenos Aires, a retrospective with films and installations from 1965 to 2013, curated by Bérénice Reynaud, and Leandro Katz | obras (Works and Alphabets), Herlitzka+Faria, Buenos Aires, Argentina. El Rastro de la Gaviota – (The Seagull’s Footprint), Tabacalera, curated by Berta Sichel, Madrid 2017. Getty Museum – Photography in Argentina 1850-2010 The J.Paul Getty Museum, curated by Idurre Alonso and Judy Keller, Los Angeles, California 2017. Proyecto para el día que me quieras y la danza de fantasmas - (Project for the day you'll love me and the ghost dance) -Museo Universitario de Arte Contemporáneo - MUAC, Mexico City, 2018, and Fundación Proa, Buenos Aires, curated by Cuauhtémoc Medina, Amanda de la Garza, and Cecilia Rabossi.

Filmography 

 CROWD 7X7 (1976) 16mm., 20 min., color, silent.
 LOS ANGELES STATION (1976) 16mm., 10 min., color, silent.
 TWELVE MOONS (& 365 SUNSETS) (1976), S8, 30 min., toned B&W, audiotape.
 MOONSHOTS (1976) 16mm., 17 min., color, silent.
 THE SHADOW (1976) 16mm., 20 min., color, silent.
 FALL (1977) 16mm., 20 min., color, silent.
 PARIS HAS CHANGED A LOT (1977) 16mm., 25 min., color, sound, vertical screen.
 SPLITS (1978) 16mm., 25 min., color, sound.
 MOON NOTES (1980) 16mm., 15 min., color, silent.
 THE VISIT (Foreign Particles) (1980) 35mm. slide sequence, 75 min., B&W, sync sound.
 METROPOTAMIA (1982) 16mm., 25 min., color, sound, zig-zag screen.
 THE JUDAS WINDOW (1982) 16mm., 17 min., color, silent.
 THE VISIT (1986) 16mm., 30 min., black and white, sound.
 REEL SIX, Charles Ludlam's Grand Tarot (1987) 16mm., 8 min., color, sound.
 MIRROR ON THE MOON (1992) 16mm., 100 min., color, sound.
 EL DIA QUE ME QUIERAS (1997) 16mm., 30 min., color, sound.
 PARADOX (2001), digital video, 30 min., color, sound.
 EXHUMACION (2007), digital video, 38 min., color, sound.
 BLUEBEARD by CHARLES LUDLAM (1970-20012), video, 9.15 min., black and white, sound.
 RHOMB (2011), digital video, 6 mins., color, sound.
 A LOVE FOR 3 OR 4 ORANGES (2015), digital video, 10 mins., color, sound.

Collections 

 Museo Universitario Arte Contemporáneo (MUAC), UNAM – Mexico City
 Canadian Centre for Architecture – Montreal, Canada
 The Getty Center for the History of Art and the Humanities – Santa Monica, California
 The Museum of Modern Art Library – New York
 The Ruth and Marvin Sackner Archive – Florida
 The Houghton Library, Rare Book Collection, Harvard University – Massachusetts
 The Brooklyn Museum, Prints and Photographs Collection – New York
 El Museo del Barrio – Permanent Collection – New York
 Museo de Arte Moderno de Buenos Aires (MAMBA), Permanent Collection, Argentina
 Sterling Memorial Library – Artists’ Books Collection, Yale University, New Haven, CT
 Museo Castagnino, Rosario, Argentina
 The Museum of Modern Art – Latin American Collection, New York
 CeDinCi Archive, Buenos Aires, Argentina
 The University of New Mexico Museum, Albuquerque, New Mexico
 The New York Public Library at Lincoln Center, Billy Rose Collection
 The Watermill Center, Robert Wilson’s Theatre Collection
 The Museum of Modern Art – Photography Collection, New York
 Museo Nacional Centro Reina Sofía, Madrid, Spain
 Colección Patricia Phelps de Cisneros, New York
 The J.Paul Getty Museum, Los Angeles, California
 Museum of Fine Arts Boston, Massachusetts
 Blanton Museum of Art, Austin, Texas
 Power Station of Art, Shanghai
 Museo Nacional de Bellas Artes. Buenos Aires

References

External links 
 Leandro Katz website
 S(h)elf Portrait at Reina Sofia
 TELAM Cultura
 The Catherwood Project at SITE Santa Fe
 Works in Henrique Faria New York gallery
 The Seagull's Footprint - Tabacalera, Madrid - Spain 
 A Canoe Trip - Henrique Faria Fine Art, New York - USA 
 Museo Universitario de Arte Contemporáneo - MUAC, México City - México -Proyecto para el día que me quieras y la danza de fantasmas
 Proa 21 - Buenos Aires - Argentina - Proyecto para el día que me quieras
 De la A a la Z: Viaje a la luna Centro de la Imagen

Further reading 
 Katz,  Leandro, The Ghosts of Ñancahuazu (Based on Freddy Alborta’s photographs of Che Guevara)  with texts by Eduardo Grüner, John Berger, Jean Franco, Mariano Mestman and Jeffrey Skoller - Bilingual edition, Viper’s Tongue Book, 2010. 
 Longoni, Ana, LEAN-DROKA-TZ with essays by Jesse Lerner, Mariano Mestman - Bilingual edition,  Colección Conceptual, Fundación Espigas / Fundación Telefónica, 2013. 
 Sackner, Marvin and Sackner, Ruth, The Art of Typewriting - Thames & Hudson, 2015. 
 Katz, Leandro and Lerner , Jesse, The Catherwood Project: Incidents of visual reconstructions and other matters - University of New Mexico Press,2018.  
 Katz, Leandro, Bedlam Days: The Early Plays of Charles Ludlam and The Ridiculous Theatrical Company (with texts from “Queer Theater” by Stefan Brecht) Viper’s Tongue Books, 2019. 
 Katz, Leandro, Los Danzantes Paradiso Ediciones, Colección Narrativa, 2022. 

1938 births
Living people
Argentine contemporary artists
Jewish Argentine writers
Writers from Buenos Aires
Artists from Buenos Aires
Rockefeller Fellows
National Endowment for the Arts Fellows
20th-century Argentine writers
20th-century Argentine male writers
21st-century Argentine writers
21st-century Argentine male writers